LineDrive Baseball is a video game developed and published by Futureline Communications for the arcade.

Gameplay
LineDrive Baseball allows the player to play as some of the great baseball players of the past.

Reception
Next Generation reviewed the arcade version of the game, rating it one star out of five, and stated that "This is the perfect example of how not to make a videogame, and it only receives one star out of kindness and because we couldn't give it any lower."

References

Baseball video games